Pavel Aleksandrovich Sudarikov (born 24 October 1972 in Lyubertsy) is a former Russian football player.

His older brother Aleksei Sudarikov also was a footballer.

References

1972 births
People from Lyubertsy
Living people
Soviet footballers
FC FShM Torpedo Moscow players
Russian footballers
FC Lokomotiv Nizhny Novgorod players
Russian Premier League players
FC Asmaral Moscow players
FC Moscow players
Association football defenders
Sportspeople from Moscow Oblast